Aaron Isaac Rosa (born May 28, 1983) is an American former professional mixed martial artist. A professional competitor from 2005 until 2013, he has competed for the UFC, Bellator, ShoXC, and Strikeforce.

Background
Born and raised in the border-town of Del Rio, Texas, Rosa was a talented football player, competing at Del Rio High School before continuing his career at Angelo State University, where he was also a standout. In January 2004, Rosa began training in mixed martial arts.

Mixed martial arts career

Early career
Rosa made his amateur debut later that year in 2004 and made his professional debut in November 2005. Rosa compiled an undefeated record of 9-0 fighting on the local circuit before being signed by ShoXC.

ShoXC
Rosa made his promotional debut on July 27, 2007 at ShoXC: Elite Challengers Series against Jefferson Silva and won via TKO. Rosa made his next appearance on October 26, 2007 against Jared Hamman and was handed his first professional defeat via rear-naked choke submission in the second round. Rosa then faced Jaime Fletcher on March 21, 2008 and was defeated again, via unanimous decision.

Rosa was scheduled to fight Seth Petruzelli, at EliteXC: Heat, but Petruzelli was moved to the main event to fight Kevin "Kimbo Slice" Ferguson after Ken Shamrock had to pull out due to an injury.

Strikeforce
After picking up a win under the Adrenaline MMA banner, Rosa made his Strikeforce debut at Strikeforce Challengers: Evangelista vs. Aina on May 15, 2009 in a Light Heavyweight bout against Anthony Ruiz. Rosa won via rear-naked choke submission in the first round. Rosa made his next appearance on November 20, 2009 at Strikeforce Challengers: Woodley vs. Bears against Rafael Cavalcante. Rosa was defeated in the second round via TKO.

At Bellator 20 he defeated veteran Robert Villegas by unanimous decision. Rosa then defeated The Ultimate Fighter 10 alumnus Abe Wagner via submission at Titan FC 17: Lashley vs. Ott.

Ultimate Fighting Championship
On May 13, 2011 it was announced that Rosa had signed with the UFC.

He made his debut against Joey Beltran at UFC 131. After a back-and-forth first two rounds, Rosa was stopped by Beltran by TKO in the third round.

Rosa was expected to face Fabio Maldonado in a Light Heavyweight bout at UFC Live: Cruz vs. Johnson. But Maldonado was forced to pull out of the bout due to an injury.

Rosa instead faced promotional newcomer Matt Lucas on November 12, 2011 at UFC on Fox 1. He won the fight via majority decision.

Rosa had his next Light Heavyweight bout against James Te-Huna on March 3, 2012 at UFC on FX 2. Rosa lost via TKO in the first round and was subsequently released from the promotion.

Bellator
After his release from the UFC, Rosa made his return to Bellator at Bellator 103 on October 11, 2013, facing Mikhail Zayats. Rosa was defeated 47 seconds into the first round via submission.

Return to MMA 
After more the 9 years away from the sport, Rosa made his return against Juan Adams at Fury FC 56 on February 6, 2022. Rosa lost the bout in the first round via ground and pound TKO.

Personal life
Rosa is married and has 2 daughters and a son.

Mixed martial arts record

|-
|  Loss
| align=center| 18–7
| Juan Adams
| TKO (punches)
| Fury FC 56
| 
| align=center| 1
| align=center| 3:08
| San Antonio, Texas, United States
| 
|-
|  Loss
| align=center| 18–6
| Mikhail Zayats
| Submission (kimura)
| Bellator 103
| 
| align=center| 1
| align=center| 0:47
| Mulvane, Kansas, United States
| 
|-
|  Win
| align=center| 18–5
| Tony Melton
| Decision (split)
| EODV: El Orgulo del Valle
| 
| align=center| 3
| align=center| 3:00
| Pharr, Texas, United States
| 
|-
|  Loss
| align=center| 17–5
| James Te-Huna
| TKO (punches)
| UFC on FX: Alves vs. Kampmann
| 
| align=center| 1
| align=center| 2:08
| Sydney, Australia
| 
|-
|  Win
| align=center| 17–4
| Matt Lucas (fighter)|Matt Lucas
| Decision (majority)
| UFC on Fox: Velasquez vs. Dos Santos
| 
| align=center| 3
| align=center| 5:00
| Anaheim, California, United States
| 
|-
| Loss
| align=center| 16–4
| Joey Beltran
| TKO (punches)
| UFC 131
| 
| align=center| 3
| align=center| 1:26
| Vancouver, British Columbia, Canada
| 
|-
|  Win
| align=center| 16–3
| Abe Wagner
| Submission (rear-naked choke)
| Titan FC 17: Lashley vs. Ott
| 
| align=center| 2
| align=center| 0:35
| Kansas City, Kansas, United States
| 
|-
|  Win
| align=center| 15–3
| Devin Cole
| Decision (unanimous)
| Shark Fights 13: Jardine vs Prangley
| 
| align=center| 3
| align=center| 5:00
| Amarillo, Texas, United States
|Heavyweight debut.
|-
|  Win
| align=center| 14–3
| Jay Peche
| TKO (punches)
| ABG: Promotions
| 
| align=center| 1
| align=center| 4:47
| San Antonio, Texas, United States
| 
|-
| Win
| align=center| 13–3
| Robert Villegas
| Decision (unanimous)
| Bellator 20
| 
| align=center| 3
| align=center| 5:00
| San Antonio, Texas, United States
| 
|-
| Loss
| align=center| 12–3
| Rafael Cavalcante
| TKO (punches)
| Strikeforce Challengers: Woodley vs. Bears
| 
| align=center| 2
| align=center| 3:25
| Kansas City, Kansas, United States
| 
|-
| Win
| align=center| 12–2
| Anthony Ruiz
| Submission (rear-naked choke)
| Strikeforce Challengers: Evangelista vs. Aina
| 
| align=center| 1
| align=center| 4:29
| Fresno, California, United States
|
|-
| Win
| align=center| 11–2
| Ron Fields
| TKO (punches)
| Adrenaline MMA: Guida vs. Russow
| 
| align=center| 2
| align=center| 0:34
| Chicago, Illinois, United States
| 
|-
| Loss
| align=center| 10–2
| Jaime Fletcher
| Decision (unanimous)
| ShoXC: Elite Challenger Series
| 
| align=center| 3
| align=center| 5:00
| Santa Ynez, California, United States
| 
|-
| Loss
| align=center| 10–1
| Jared Hamman
| Submission (rear-naked choke)
| ShoXC: Elite Challenger Series
| 
| align=center| 2
| align=center| 1:46
| Santa Ynez, California, United States
| 
|-
| Win
| align=center| 10–0
| Jefferson Silva
| TKO (doctor stoppage)
| ShoXC: Elite Challenger Series
| 
| align=center| 1
| align=center| 5:00
| Santa Ynez, California, United States
| 
|-
| Win
| align=center| 9–0
| Matt Thomas
| Decision (split)
| World Cage Fighting 1
| 
| align=center| 3
| align=center| 3:00
| Southaven, Mississippi, United States
| 
|-
| Win
| align=center| 8–0
| Corey Salter
| TKO (punches)
| JJL Promotions: Sudden Impact 1
| 
| align=center| 3
| align=center| 0:10
| San Antonio, Texas, United States
| 
|-
| Win
| align=center| 7–0
| Jesse Vasquez
| TKO (punches)
| Renegades Extreme Fighting
| 
| align=center| 2
| align=center| 0:10
| Houston, Texas, United States
| 
|-
| Win
| align=center| 6–0
| Anthony Trotter
| TKO (punches)
| NLE: Ultimate Fright Night
| 
| align=center| 2
| align=center| N/A
| Bossier City, Louisiana, United States
| 
|-
| Win
| align=center| 5–0
| Robert Masko
| Decision (unanimous)
| Renegades Extreme Fighting
| 
| align=center| 4
| align=center| 5:00
| Houston, Texas, United States
| 
|-
| Win
| align=center| 4–0
| Lance Ramoth
| Submission (rear-naked choke)
| Renegades Extreme Fighting
| 
| align=center| 4
| align=center| 0:28
| Houston, Texas, United States
| 
|-
| Win
| align=center| 3–0
| Patrick Miller
| Submission (rear-naked choke)
| Renegades Extreme Fighting
| 
| align=center| 1
| align=center| 0:44
| Houston, Texas, United States
| 
|-
| Win
| align=center| 2–0
| Matt Thompson
| Decision (unanimous)
| Renegades Extreme Fighting
| 
| align=center| 3
| align=center| 5:00
| Austin, Texas, United States
| 
|-
| Win
| align=center| 1–0
| Shane Faulkner
| Decision (unanimous)
| Renegades Extreme Fighting
| 
| align=center| 3
| align=center| 5:00
| Houston, Texas, United States
|

References

External links

Official UFC Profile

American male mixed martial artists
American mixed martial artists of Mexican descent
American practitioners of Brazilian jiu-jitsu
1983 births
Living people
Mixed martial artists from Texas
Heavyweight mixed martial artists
Light heavyweight mixed martial artists
Mixed martial artists utilizing Brazilian jiu-jitsu
People from Del Rio, Texas
Ultimate Fighting Championship male fighters